B15 or B-15 may refer to:

 B15 (New York City bus), a New York City bus line
 Ampeg Portaflex B-15 bass amplifier, introduced in 1960
 HLA-B15, an HLA-B serotype
 Iceberg B-15, the largest iceberg on record as of 2006
 London Buses route B15
 Pangamic acid, commonly referred to as B15
 Boeing XB-15, a U.S. bomber
 Bundesstraße 15, a German road
 Boron-15 (B-15 or 15B), an isotope of boron
 One of the ECO codes for the Caro–Kann Defence in chess
 Nissan Sentra chassis code, years 2000–2006
 A nickname for Brandon Marshall, Denver Broncos wide receiver
 LNER Class B15, a class of 20 British steam locomotives